Aag is an alternative/pop-rock/synth band from Pakistan. Consisting of brothers Haroon Sheikh and Usman Sheikh, Aag has featured in musical shows in Pakistan including Velo Sound Station, Levi's Live, and Pepsi Battle of the Bands. Formed in 2005, Aag has released several original songs including “Aag”, “Kafla”, “Phir Se” and the melancholic “Veeraan”.

Productions 
Aag has also been a part of the production in music show, Nescafe Basement. Haroon & Usman also produced a number of songs in Velo Sound Station including Sajjad Ali's Dhuan.

Discography

Singles 

 Aag
 Kafla
 Phir Se
 Veeran

Velo Sound Station 

 Sun Zara

Renditions 

 National Anthem (Acapella Version) 
 National Songs Medley (Acapella Version)  
 Tum Duur Thay (Originally Performed by Vital Signs)

Pepsi Battle of the Bands 

 Jahil

Nescafe Basement 

 Phir Se 
 Do Pal

References

External Links 
Aag (band) on Facebook

Pakistani musical groups
Bands by language
Pakistani rock music groups
Pakistani rock musicians